Alvand Mirza was a Aq Qoyunlu prince, who was a contender for the throne between 1497 and 1504/5.

Life 
He was son of Yusuf Bayandur, who was the grandson of Uzun Hasan. In 1478 he was appointed as the governor of Shiraz. In 1498, Alvand was enthroned in Tabriz by Ayba-Sultan.

Reign 
In 1500, the Abhar agreement was signed. The Aq Qoyunlu Empire was divided between Sultan Murad and Alvand Mirza. Azerbaijan and Diyarbakir remained under Alvand's rule. In 1500, a representative of the Safavid dynasty from Azerbaijan began to claim throne. In 1501, the battle of Sharur took place. In this battle Alvand Mirza was defeated by Ismail I. After the battle he fled to Erzincan and died in Mardin in 1505.

In 1501, Ismail entered Tabriz and proclaimed himself shah.

References

Sources 
 
 
 

Aq Qoyunlu rulers
15th-century births
1505 deaths
15th-century monarchs in the Middle East